The Georgetown Armoury is a Canadian Forces armoury in Georgetown, Ontario. In the Canadian Forces, an armoury is a place where a reserve unit trains, meets, and parades.

Houses
The armoury is the base of Halton Company – The Lorne Scots, a light infantry regiment that is part of 32 Canadian Brigade Group. The armoury also houses the regiment's Transport Unit, the Lorne Scots Pipes and Drums and two cadet units.

The armoury was built to replace the old Georgetown Armouries (c. 1866) at 1 Park Avenue at the Georgetown Fairgrounds Park. The new building is located at 91 Todd Road, Georgetown, Ontario, and opened in 1997.

References

See also
List of Armouries in Canada

Armouries in Canada
Lorne Scots (Peel, Dufferin and Halton Regiment)